The Kupari (from  referring to the godfather of one's godchild; word derived from Kumpari and feminine being Kumari or Portuguese; comadre) consist of Kadodi Christians and Samvedi Christians, which are a Roman Catholic Brahmin sub-group in the Christian Bombay East Indian community, of the people of Konkan division. The population is about 40,000 to 45,000. The two  Konkani dialects spoken by the Kuparis are Samvedi Boli Bhasha and Kadodi, which are a mixture of Guzerati, Mahratti & Indo-Portuguese. 97% of the population is Roman Catholic and the remaining minority is a mixed population of various Protestant Revolutionary denominations.

History
The Samvedi Christian community came into existence during the Portuguese rule of Vasai in the 15th century, when most of the Samvedi Brahmans who converted to Christianity as their possessions were confiscated, and they were ostracised by ultra-conservative Brahmans. Their native speech is known as Kadodi which is a dialect of Marathi-Konkani languages. Till the late 1960s and early 1970s the population was highly dependent on farming.

The Samvedi Christian community is mostly concentrated around these parishes in northern Vasai:

Nandakhal - Holy Spirit Church 
Nirmal - Holy Cross Church
Agashi - St. James Church
Vatar - Our Lady of Nazareth Community Center(works under the vicar of Nandakhal since 2006 AD)
Umrala - St. Joseph Church(bifurcated from Nandakhal in 1970 AD)
Nanbhat - St. Paul Church(bifurcated from Nandakhal in 1975 AD)
Bolinj - Christ the King Church(bifurcated from Nandakhal in 2001 AD)
Rajodi - Our Lady of Velankanni(bifurcated from Nandakhal 1999 AD)
Mardes, Wagholi - Our Lady of Velankanni(bifurcated from Nirmal)
Gomes Ali - Holy Trinity Church(bifurcated from Nirmal)
Bhuigaon - Holy Family Church(bifurcated from Nirmal)
Gass - St. Gonsalo Garcia Church(bifurcated from Nirmal)
Jyoti - Our Lady of Light(bifurcated from Agashi)
Shirlaiwadi - Our Lady of Lourdes(bifurcated from Agashi)

The first three in the list Agashi, Nirmal & Nandakhal were the only 3 churches built in north Vasai during the era of Portuguese Bombay and Bassein. Over 9 churches in total were built by the Portuguese in whole of Vasai of which these 3 churches in north Bassein. The parishes under these 3 churches were further bifurcated and brought closer to neighbourhoods, for the convenience the church attendance by parishioners.

Costume
The traditional costume of the Samvedi Christian community  consists of a Dhoti also called "Ponya" in local language, white shirt, black sleeveless jacket kabja and a red cap with earring vali pierced in the left ear for men, and a red blouse soli with red checkered kashta also called "lugadaa"(a type of sari for women).

Traditions
Baltim (Baptism:This is a traditional Christian ritual wherein a newborn is baptised to free him from the original sin of Adam and Eve)
Komsar (Confession:One of the seven sacraments, also known as penance)
Cominyao (First Holy Communion)
Hamdao (Associated with marriage: People from the groom's side send a garland for the bride and traditional sweets to be distributed in the locality, just before the wedding banns are announced in the church)
Hadisoli (A procession of people from the groom's side with the Marriage band visit the Groom's maternal side to invite his maternal side for the wedding.)
Aayez (A traditional way where the kupari people from the groom's side sent all the valuables like Saris and jewelleries etc. to the bride's side)
Lagin/Varad (Wedding)
Saudio (Celebration next to wedding day:A day reserved for all the people who have helped in organizing the wedding feast.)
Haira (Engagement)

Recipes
Variety of fish gravies (specially Bombil)
Indel (specially prepared meat/fish to last for certain days) anglicized vidialo
Vade/Talnayo Rotyo (fried bread made from mixture of flours)
Phuge (soft spherical sweet, but made up of wheat and Suun)
Dhapti (steamed bread made from mixture of flours and vegetables)
Hingoli (traditional specialty, similar to pita bread with traditional sweet filling, deep fried in vegetable oil)
Dodal (Portuguese Sweet)
Fuddi (Portuguese feijoada (typical dish made with pork))
Sanna (Rice Bread)
Karji (similar to Hingoli, but coconut and sugar filling)
Laadu (local spherical sweet)
Vaalaai Bhaji
Revala (sweet made up of rice flour, jaggery, & coconut milk)
 Narlipak (sweet dish made by coconut & sugar)

Festivals
Natal(Festival of nativity christmas)
Easter
Pali
Bandra Fair
Donger Mavli han
Khursa han
Sa Jav so han

Kuparis today
Kuparis have been well educated for generations. They are hardworking, which aids their ventures in a variety of sectors. In recent years Kuparis have shown transition towards various sectors, including engineering, medicine, and corporate enterprises. A considerable amount of the Kupari population has relocated to the North America, Europe, Middle East and Australia.

Population and Distribution
A rough estimate of the population is about 45000.

Ethnicity
Most of the kuparis have their ancestry through Samvedi Brahmin community while some trace few relations in the neighbouring Vadval community as well as the Goan community due to inter communal marriages.  Minor traces of Portuguese ancestry in this community cannot be denied due to Portuguese intercommunal marriages during Portuguese rule as in case of St. Gonsalo Garcia.

History
On 23 December 1534, the Sultan of Gujarat, signed a treaty with the Portuguese and ceded Bassein with its dependencies of Salsette, Mombaim (Bombay), Parel, Vadala, Shiv (Sion), Vorli (Worli), Mazagao (Mazgao), Thane, Vandre(Bandra), Mahim, Caranja.
In 1548, St. Francisco Xavier stopped in Bassein to preach.  This marked the advent of Christianity into Bassein.   Missionaries with motive of conversions serve the poor people who were farmers, and thus those who are touched by missionaries, excommunicated by orthodox Brahmin community and declared as untouchables.  These outcast Hindu were then converted by Christian missionaries (Roman Catholic) with promises of land, other monitory benefit, better status, etc.  The churches distributed the seized land amongst east Indians.  Along with new names and dress codes the new converts were also endowed with political upper hand during Portugal rule.  Today these missionaries also run Schools and hospitals benefiting both Christian and non-Christian.  Despite initial hostility the converts and Hindus are happily sharing their neighbourhood.
During this period Portuguese built 3 churches in present-day northern bassein for these converts: Manickpur "St.Michael Church"(1530), Nirmal (1557), Agashi (1568), Nandakhal (1573).  All these churches are still used by the Christian community of Vasai.

Religious Practices

Paya bharni
This is the ceremony that is conducted when the foundation stone for a house has been laid. Ceremony begins with the burial of some jewellery into the earth and breaking of a coconut the priest then makes some prayers and blesses its construction.  This ceremony has its roots in the Hindu tradition of bhoomi pujan.

Bejimat
Bejimat is the ceremony conducted during the inauguration of a new home.  During this ceremony a priest is invited to a home who then prays before the people sprinkles holy water throughout the home and blesses it.

Yentar
This ceremony is conducted when final funeral rites are given to a person. This is conducted in a church followed by prayers and burial at a cemetery.

Saatvoh
This ceremony is conducted on the seventh day of a funeral.  During this the affected family dedicates a mass for the dead this is followed by a dining service at the family's place which usually includes meat and alcohol to mark the passing of sorrow.

Upas(Korosma)
This is the fast carried out during the lent season of 40 days.
   
As respect to their Hindu roots they abstain from beef consumption.

Its carried out in the month between March and April

Religious Services
The religious services of the Samvedi Christian community confirm with the seven sacraments of the Roman Catholic faith. Some of them can be seen below.

Baltim (Baptism)
A new born infant is taken to the church and blessed by holy water and fire in presence of his/her parents, relatives, godmother and godfather .... hence he will be called by a name decide by his/her parents. its almost like a name ceremony.

Cominyao, Komsar (First Holy Communion)
Also called as the first holy communion because it is the first time when a child baptised as catholic receives the holy eucharist.

Chrisma (Confirmation)

Varad [Lagin] (Wedding)

Varad i.e. wedding is a ritual where the bride and groom exchange vows in the catholic church. The bride wears a white gown and the groom wears black suit. The bridesmaid and bestman are the witnesses for the bride and groom respectively.
The couple exchange wedding rings as a remembrance of their lifetime commitment.
There after a reception is done to celebrate the occasion.

Yentar (portuguese word-entierro)  (Final Funeral rites)

Lifestyle and Culture

Olden Days

Language
Kadodi

Clothing
Ponya and Lugda are still worn, particularly by old people. With changing times, people have adopted western clothing and fewer people are seen with the traditional clothes. In order to keep the tradition alive, young people do wear the traditional Ponya and Lugda on special occasions such as weddings.

Traditions

Navna
This word is derived from (Nahana in Hindi). This is a ceremony similar to Haldi in other cultures across India which consists of bathing the bride and the groom with haldi(turmeric) and coconut oil. This ceremony typically takes place on Saturday morning(a day prior to the wedding day) early in the morning. The water for bathing is brought from a nearby source of water (a well, borewell or a pond) in a procession with drums and singing traditional songs. This ceremony is followed by attending the morning Mass at the parish Church.

Ayaez
Ayaez means ornaments owned by a married woman given to her by in-laws on a day before the marriage ceremony; also the ornaments given by her parents on the wedding day.

Hamdao
Before the marriage the in-laws of the bride send garlands[aboli, gulshedi, shevanti, etc.]and sweets(laadoo, karji, mesoor, khaja, etc.)to the bride and she distributes it to her relatives and to her neighbors.

Saudio
It's the day after  the wedding day. On this day at the groom's house the relatives play pranks and take money from the newly married couple [also known as postao in Kadodi language]on this day mostly in the evening the bride's relatives dress in old traditional dresses and go to the groom's house singing and dancing with music played on musical instrument known as "GHUMAT"[a drum made from earthen pot which has openings on both the sides one opening is tied with leather] when the bride's relatives reach the groom's house, his relatives play pranks on them like putting spices in the drinks which is being served to them after all the fun the bride's relatives take newly married couple to the bride's place for a day.

See also
East Indians
Samvedi Brahmin
Christian Cxatria
Basseinites
Portuguese India
Marathi people

References 

http://www.binisaya.com/cebuano/kumpari

Social groups of Maharashtra
Catholic Church in India
Indian Roman Catholics
Social groups of Goa